Zarabad-e Gharbi Rural District is a rural district (dehestan) in Zarabad District, Konarak County, Sistan and Baluchestan province, Iran. At the 2006 census, its population was 8,997, in 1,998 families.  The rural district has 33 villages.

References 

Rural Districts of Sistan and Baluchestan Province
Konarak County